Shenzhen Bogang F.C. was a football club that last participated in the China League Two. It was located in the Bogang Community (formerly Village) in Shajing Street, Shenzhen. Being able to trace its origins back in 1941, when the village team of Bogang was established under Japanese occupation, it boasted the record of the oldest Chinese football squad that was active. To add on that, it was also the team that had won the most championships (5) in the Chinese Champions League (including its predecessor National Football Amateur (Class C) League); however, it stopped participating in national competitions until the 2019 season, in which it won 2nd place and was promoted.

History

Early history 
The village of Bogang has a long history of football and is known as the "Hometown of Football". Its football history can be traced back to 1941, when the Japanese invading China and occupying Hong Kong, as about 100 villagers who were making a living in Hong Kong, and were members of the Hong Kong football team, returned to their home village and continued to resist Japan. In order to continue the anti-Japanese War, the returning youths set up the first football team in Bogang. It was reported that the players used football to share secret information, as sports was considered legitimate by the Japanese and such gatherings were allowed.

As Shenzhen was named a "Special economics zone" in 1980, many villages in Shenzhen became rich. Villagers of Bogang decided to avoid bad habits from those villages from affecting them, so in 1992, football was included in the quality education program for the villagers of Bogang Village.

Children in Bogang started football training in elementary school. Of the more than 1,800 residents in the Bogang community, 80% of the males can play football. Football teams were formed from different age groups of residents, from children to the elderly, with the oldest player being over 80 years old. There are more than 220 football players in the entire community, and as many as 800 residents involved in football.

Formation of a club 
In 1998, with the approval of the Chinese Football Association, Bogang established the country's first village-level football club, and the Bogang football team has become the first amateur team in the country to have a dedicated football field.

In 2002, the Chinese Champions League was established. The Bogang Football Team became one of the founding teams of the tournament. In the same year, under the leadership of coach Ding Sheng, they won 2nd place, only beaten 3–1 by Guangzhou Restaurant.

In 2003, they defeated Hunan Sports in a 7–6 penalty shootout after a 1–1 draw. In 2004, they defeated Qingdao Liming 2–0 after finishing top of Group B and defeating Yunnan Satellite Channel in a penalty shootout. In 2005, they again won the championship, after defeating Shanghai Songjiang Gas. In 2006, they defeated Changchun Normal University 3–1. In 2007, they again won the championship after defeating Yanji Court, winning the championship for 5 consecutive times.

Due to their outstanding performances, the Chinese Football Association and other relevant parties have asked them to be promoted to the China League Two, but the then owner of the club, Boang Co., Ltd. (an economic entity restructured from the collective property of Bogang Village), declined the request as they considered the investments in playing professionally too large, and defied their original will of "free-for-all" football. In the 12 years afterwards, they only played in regional contests. In 2018, the Palm Eco-Town Development Company Limited, (owned by Championship team West Brom's current chairman Lai Guochuan), officially participated in the investment in Shenzhen Bogang Football Club, and on July 10, 2018, Shenzhen Bogang Football Club Co., Ltd. was formally established, and Li Haiqiang, who had led former club Meixian Techand to League 1, was hired as the team coach. On March 14, 2019, Shenzhen Bogang held the ceremony to begin its quest for League 2 that year. It played its first match in the new, but familiar Chinese Champions League, beating Nanning Binjiang 5-0. Later, they managed to advance to the final stages and eventually to the final of 2019 Chinese Champions League. On 19 October, they won 2–1 against Nanjing Fengfan in the first leg of the final at home, but they were defeated 4–1 in the away leg at Nanjing, and finished as runners-up in the league, gaining promotion to the China League Two for the first time in its 78 years of existence.

Current squad

First team

Formation of players 
Most of the members of the Bogang football team are college students in the area, and many of them are studying at the Guangzhou Sport University to receive professional football training. The team also attracted a number of retired stars to join, such as the retired internationals Hu Zhijun, Yao Devie, Zhang Yuewen and so on. Although Bogang is only an amateur team, but its strength is comparable to a professional team.

Academies 
Bogang has a set of effective football training system, with football teams of all ages from children, teenagers, youth to adulthood, seniors and other groups, and also the women's team. Some members from the youth academy including Lin Jianwei, Chen Bofeng were chosen into the Chinese Junior Football Team.

Honours

References 

Defunct football clubs in Guangdong
Sport in Shenzhen
Association football clubs established in 1998
Association football clubs disestablished in 2021
1998 establishments in China
2021 disestablishments in China